Luther "Nick" Jeralds Stadium is a 5,520-seat college football stadium located in Fayetteville, North Carolina. The Stadium is home to the Broncos of Fayetteville State University. They compete in the National Collegiate Athletic Association (NCAA) Division II Central Intercollegiate Athletic Association (CIAA).

References

External links
Fayetteville State Broncos - Football website

College football venues
Fayetteville State Broncos football
Buildings and structures in Fayetteville, North Carolina
Sports venues in Cumberland County, North Carolina
American football venues in North Carolina
2003 establishments in North Carolina
Sports venues completed in 2003